Charles Cecil Shanklin Jr. (September 3, 1921 – August 19, 2006) was an American professional basketball player. He played for the Oshkosh All-Stars in the National Basketball League during the 1944–45 season and averaged 3.2 points per game. 

Shanklin also played minor league baseball. He competed for the Zanesville Cubs (1942), Lockport Cubs (1943), Kansas City Blues (1944), and the Little Rock Travelers (1945).

References

1921 births
2006 deaths
American men's basketball players
Baseball players from Indianapolis
Basketball players from Indianapolis
Guards (basketball)
Kansas City Blues (baseball) players
Little Rock Travelers players
Lockport Cubs players
Oshkosh All-Stars players
Zanesville Cubs players